The lives of Palestinian women have transformed throughout many historical changes including Ottoman control, the British Mandate, and Israeli occupation. The founding of the Palestine Liberation Organization in 1964 and the later establishment of the Palestinian Authority in 1994 also played a role in redefining the roles of women in Palestine and across the Palestinian diaspora. Women have been involved in resistance movements in Palestine as well as in Jordan, Syria, and Lebanon throughout the 20th century and into the 21st century.

History 

There was a shift in that social order in 1844 when women first participated alongside men in protesting against the first Jewish settlements near the town of Afulah. Between 1900 and 1910, as the region of Palestine (which included what is now Jordan) was under Ottoman rule, Arab women initiated the creation of numerous associations and societies. These organizations were formed mostly in the larger cities, and especially in cities with large Christian populations such as Jaffa, Jerusalem, Haifa, and Acre. In 1917, they took part in large demonstrations at the time of the Balfour Declaration, and later formed a 14-member delegation that demanded that the Balfour Declaration be revoked and that Jewish immigration to Palestine be halted. In 1921, Palestinian women organized by setting up their own society known as the Arab Women's Association, (fr) based in Jerusalem. The society organized demonstrations against the Palestinian Jewish settlements. Due to the lack of funding and the social and political pressure which was put on the women of the Arab Women's Association, the group ceased to exist after two years. Women formed a 'rescue committee' to collect donations in order to revive it. In the 1929 Palestine riots, women took part in multiple protests and demonstrations which resulted in women being killed by the British Mandate forces. They  organized a Women's Conference, where they sent out a protest letter to King George V and to the League of Nations.

Following the creation of the state of Israel in 1948, the participation of Palestinian women in opposition was almost non-existent due to a strict social order in society at the time. The displacement and loss of land for the Palestinians created an economic issue. This created a demand for women in the workforce despite the social restrictions.

Following the establishment of the Palestinian Liberation Organization (PLO) in 1964, helped create the sect known as the Palestinian Women’s Association, which allowed women to take part in the first session of the Palestinian National Council that was held in Jerusalem.

Israeli–Palestinian conflict 
The Israeli–Palestinian conflict has seriously affected the Palestinian women. Since the beginning of the 20th century and subsequent Israeli-Palestinian Conflicts, Palestinian women’s activities have been closely linked to national self-determination; thus, Palestinian women’s movement grew in tandem with Palestinian national movements. During these struggles for national self-determination, we see many women’s movements take  pragmatic steps towards demanding their rights, often choosing to override women’s liberation for support in nationalist causes. At a time in which participation mattered the most, they seized the opportunity to enhance their skills of organization, conduct military operations, and plan changes in family law to secure their status in a future state if they were to establish one successfully.

Participation in resistance movements during the 20th century 
The emergence of women’s movement can be traced to the 1920s, where the policies of the British Mandate and Zionist immigration lead to growing nationalist sentiments. National struggle mobilized educated middle and upper-class women to form the first Palestinian Women’s Union in Jerusalem in 1921. Large demonstrations would be organized and attended by women to demand the repeal of the Balfour Declaration and limit Zionist immigration to Palestine as they feared their encroachment on Palestinian land. On October 29, 1929, the first Women’s Conference was convened in Jerusalem to an audience of hundreds of women to form future programs, such as demonstrations, spreading leaflets, and organizing sit-ins, all to protest British Mandatory policies put in place on them.

During the 1936-39 Arab revolt in Palestine, many Palestinians revolted against the British administration, calling for an end to British rule and the end of Jewish immigration. Women’s movement during this period coordinated with national movements to boycott foreign and Zionist products, organize protests against British and Zionist threats, smuggle arms past British Army checkpoints, and organize relief efforts for families of men who were imprisoned. Men were not allowed to move so freely as women, thus many acted as couriers, collecting money to further fund the nationalist movement. Certain women were also trained in how to handle a rifle and at times, although rarely, women engaged in armed conflict against the British, leading some to be wounded or killed.

In the aftermath of the 1948 Arab-Israeli War, many Palestinians were expelled from their homes leading many to find refuge in other nations such as Jordon, Syria, and Lebanon. Following the incident known as the Nakba, many women were concerned about their own survival leading to a decline in women’s public activity. Nevertheless, such an exodus forced the women’s movement, emerging in the 50s and 60s, to expand its outreach to support families in desperation. The Palestinian Women’s Union established orphanages, health clinics, and first-aid centers in the West Bank. Politically, many would join political organizations such as the Jordanian Communist Party, the Arab National Movement, and other underground political parties during this period of exile. The women that occupied these political movements were those of the middle class, as limitations from socio-economic pressures hampered their ability to branch out their movements to poorer neighborhoods and refugee camps. Nevertheless, the role of women in these parties was often times limited as very few attained leadership roles, and many were pushed into social service sectors; the aspect of women’s liberation was given little attention in these movements.

Following the Six-Day War in 1967, Israel successfully defeated the coalition of Arab states and gained control of the West Bank and the Gaza Strip. During this occupation of once-Palestinian land, Israel implemented structural changes that changed the socio-economic lives of the population, resulting in Palestine’s economy depending heavily on Israel’s economy. The women of Palestine now faced a triple form of oppression through class, gender, and nationality. Radicalized by escalating events, women such as Leila Khaled, joined the Palestinian Resistance Movement (PRM) and took up armed struggle as many would be trained both militarily and politically. Ever pragmatic, the PRM still implemented a strict division of labor between men and women and between the young and old. Women's duties were regulated to nursing and providing food and uniforms for soldiers. Younger members were sent to camps to be trained in armed struggle, whilst the older women filled the administrative roles. Elsewhere, another movement emerged, one different from the strategies of previous organizations, one that sought to effectively mobilize those from universities, villages, and refugee camps. Announced in 1978 on International Women’s Day, the Women’s Work Committee came to represent an association willing to develop a strategy to combine national liberation and women's liberation. The founders of the committee were disappointed in the actions of previous charitable societies as they failed to educate the general population; to rectify this issue, they launched programs promoting literacy, health education, and classes teaching embroidery. Further aiding those of a working-class background, they started daycare centers to allow them to continue working as their children were being cared for.

In the early 1980s, the Women’s Work Committee would split into four separate committees as a result of differing political agendas and ideologies. The largest of these organizations was the Federation of Palestinian Women’s Action Committees (FPWAC) which aligned itself with the Democratic Front for the Liberation of Palestine (DFLP). The Union of Palestinian Women Working Women’s Committee (UPWWC) supported the Palestinian Communist Party, and the remaining organizations were the Union of Palestinian Women’s Committees (UPWC) and the Women’s Committee for Social Work (WCSW). Due to opposing views and strategies on organizing, each organization attracted different members of society; for example, the UPWWC organized mainly working women while the UPWC concentrated on more educated middle-class members, and the WCSW was more alike to the charitable societies which provided services to women rather than mobilizing them politically.

During the First Intifada, a mass mobilization of the Palestinian population against their Israeli occupiers commenced after years of resistance. In the midst of this uprising, all four of the Women’s committees began to mobilize their members to sustain the Intifada, all the meanwhile calling for their liberation if they were to successfully implement a free Palestinian state. The daycare centers were opened longer to allow mothers to participate in the uprising and health education began to offer classes on first aid to use on the victims of the Israeli army. These committees would take up the call of the Unified National Leadership of the Uprising (UNLU) to entice those unwilling to participate in the demonstrations. Organizing marches, promoting boycotts, and confronting soldiers allowed women of all ages to participate, leading some to become victims, either imprisoned or killed by shots from Israeli troops, gas inhalation, or beatings. During the 1988, International Women’s Day march, slogans calling for both an independent state and women’s liberation were exalted simultaneously. On the same day, a joint effort by all four of the committees participated in a program calling women to join popular committees, trade unions, boycotts, and encouraging a ‘home economy’ built off locally produced food and clothing. Although serving a role in the uprising, the call for women’s liberation was sidelined for the national movement as the UNLU would exclude women from participating in demonstrations and retaining an attitude that was viewed as conservative and condescending.

Women's rights in Palestine 
Women’s rights in Palestine have changed numerous times over the course of recent Palestinian history. Many of the laws enacted during Ottoman control, the British Mandate, Egyptian and Jordanian control, as well as Israeli occupation, have continued to be maintained throughout the 20th century and into the 21st century. In 1967, Israel annexed Palestinian territories in the Gaza Strip and the West Bank. The Oslo Agreement in 1995 established further divisions within Palestinian territory: the West Bank was divided into Area A, Area B, and Area C which makes up 60% of the West Bank. The Palestinian Authority (PA) maintains the administrative duties and internal security of Area A; Area B is under the jurisdiction of both the PA and Israel; and Area C is fully under Israeli military and gubernatorial control. The West Bank continues to feel the effects of the Jordanian Penal Code of 1960 on its legal system. Whereas, the legal system of the Gaza Strip is still impacted by penal codes set during the British Mandate as well as Egyptian control, today the territory is governed by the Palestinian group Hamas and is occupied by Israel. The legal system in Palestine is not uniform across all territories which indicates that women's rights are subjected to different codes of law depending on where they are in Palestine.

Laws on family matters 
Divorce rights for women depend on the personal status laws that apply to Muslims, which state that a man can divorce his wife for any reason, while women can request divorce only under certain circumstances. If a woman proceeds to a divorce she does not need to present any evidence, but would give up any financial rights and must return her dowry. The Ministry of Women's Affairs in Palestine, established in 2003, is the main governmental agency responsible for promoting and protecting women's rights. Government ministries promote reform of discriminatory laws and gender units have been established in each ministry. When a woman gets a divorce, she has custody of her children up until they are a certain age, depending on whether they live in the Gaza Strip or the West Bank. Ottoman-era laws on shared marital property continues to restrict the division of belongings between partners after divorce. In November 2019, a Presidential Decree raised the minimum marriage age to 18 years-old for both the West Bank and the Gaza Strip, though exceptions could be made by Sharia courts for Palestinian Muslims; this exception could also be applied to Palestinian Christians. Practices relating to family matters differ based on different religious traditions in Islam and the varying sects of Christianity present in Palestine.

Rape and abortion laws 
Up until the 2000s, there had been laws in both the West Bank and the Gaza Strip allowing rapists to escape punishment by marrying their rape victims. In the West Bank, this law had been maintained by the Jordanian Penal Code of 1960, whereas in the Gaza Strip a similar standard had been kept up by the British Penal Code of 1936 and during Egyptian control of the territory. While rape is criminalized in both penal codes, the ability to escape punishment or mitigating conditions with "honor" killings created insecurity for rape victims in the West Bank and Gaza. In 2018, the Jordanian Penal Code of 1960 upholding this standard in the West Bank was officially repealed. The penal code in the Gaza Strip had been repealed by the Egyptian People's Assembly in 1999. Additionally, both the application of the Jordanian Penal Code of 1960 in the West Bank and the British Penal Code of 1936 in the Gaza Strip prohibit abortions, though abortions may be permitted in cases of incest, rape, or endangerment of the mother's life.

The Labor Law of 2000 
The Palestinian Labor Law of 2000 was enacted in an attempt to create some uniformity of legal precedents for labor laws across the various jurisdictions of Palestinian territories. The law reformed the previous labor regulations put in place by during Jordanian and Egyptian control (of the West Bank and Gaza Strip respectively) for men and women, thus creating a more equal work environment. This labor law states that Palestinians have the right to work if they are capable of doing so and should not be discriminated against in the process. The Labor Law provides women with maternity leave before and after pregnancy; it prohibits gender-based discrimination, though does not explicitly address the gender-based violence in the workplace.

Women's rights organizations 
There are many organizations working in Palestinian territories today to help reform the legal system and protect women's rights. The Women's Center for Legal Aid and Counseling (WCLAC) works to reform personal status laws and support Palestinian women that face domestic violence as well as violence from Israeli forces. UN Women conducts research on the Palestinian legal system and works to ensure gender equality within Palestinian territories. The Aisha Association for Women and Child Protection provides mental health support for Palestinian women and girls impacted by the Israeli–Palestinian conflict.

Education of the girl

Under the Ottoman Empire 
Under Ottoman occupation (1516-1917)[1], there was not enough resources invested in schooling. There were a few public and private schools located in the most populated regions which influenced the high illiteracy rate across all genders but especially for women. In the mid-19th century, Christian missionaries began to come to Palestine in droves in attempts to transform and convert Palestinian communities who were referred to as “backwards” and “heathens”. Due to fears of western imperialism and foreign Christian education, the Ottoman government began to emphasize state-sponsored education. In 1864, the Ottoman government created a policy that would only allow missionaries to create schools in communities with large Christian populations in order to prevent the expansion of western imperialism within the Ottoman empire. And under the reign of SultanʿAbdul Hamid II, the Law of Public Education of 1869 was implemented ten years after its creation. Under this law, elementary education was mandatory for all children under the age of 12. This piece of legislation also acknowledged the need for the education of girls as well as their education beyond the primary level; this resulted in the development of co-educational education as well as gender segregated schooling in the regions that had the finances to maintain both schools. However, the promises made by the 1869 law never came to fruition as many girls were at most able to acquire intermediate level education due to the lack of resources.

With the introduction of the press in Palestine in 1908, journalists and theorists began to openly criticize the quality of education under Christian missionaries. In 1911, the literary journal al-Nafaʾis al-ʿasriyya, a ghost writer under the initials Kh. S, wrote an article about women’s education in Greater Syria, the region which included Palestine. In the format of a dialogue between a woman and her servant, the article discusses the lack of nationalist and home management education for young girls. Through the eyes of Arab Nationalists, without nationalist education in combination with training to be mothers and wives, women would not only be unable to care for their families but they would also produce generations of Arabs that did not know the Arabic language or values. Many schools in the Ottoman empire, under the guise of being state-run, gave missionaries and western organizations like the American Colony the authority to administer schools.

Under British Mandate 
During World War I (1914-1918), the Ottoman government faced economic, political and social hardship which resulted in the further deterioration of their schools. The casualties due to military service in WWI in combination with the famine caused by the British blockade of the Syrian coast, hundreds of thousands lost, leaving women and children to protect and defend themselves. Following the war, the Ottoman Empire conceded the territory of Palestine in 1918, and following the San Remo Conference, the United Kingdom was given the mandate to provide “administrative advice and assistance” until Palestine could govern themselves (Article XXII of Covenant of the League of Nations). The British colonial administration witnessed this chaotic time and invested within education understanding that education could protect girls from the effects of the war.

The first Director of Education, Humphrey Bowman (1920-1936) expressed the need for education in order to “train up good citizens of the country.” However, this intent to support the education of children, specifically girls, was neglected and communities across Palestine did not receive the resources needed to expand the education of girls. As regions had to deal with overcrowded and understaffed schools, the British enforced standards that only worsened the conditions. Regions like the district of Hebron who only had one school to support 70,000 residents (resulting in 77% of student applications being turned away), were forced to build a new girls' school without the financial assistance of the British. Due to the lack of funding, schools, especially ones for girls, were never expanded or often times, ever built. In rural villages, girls had even less access to education for financial reasons, such as the mandatory construction of separate schools for boys and girls, but as well as agricultural ones. The British were concerned that with too much education, it would be a crisis as it would "leave the fields untilled or…lessen the fitness or disposition of the people for agricultural employment" in the words of Lord Cromer, the British Consul General to Egypt.

In 1920, the High Commissioner for Palestine, Herbert Samuel, approved the construction of 300 rural elementary schools for both girls and boys in four years, but by 1925, only 98 new buildings have been constructed and only 10 were for girls. Additionally, A. L. Tibawi states that the British administration reduced their educational budget from £130,000 in 1921 to £97,279 in 1923-1924, while simultaneously increasing their state revenue by over a million pounds over ten years (1921-1931). By the end of the Mandate period (1948), the government only administered 80 girls schools in all of Palestine with 15,303 students, and Arab girls made up only 21% of all the students in government schools. Only about 7.5 percent of girls in rural areas received an education in comparison to 60% of girls in urban regions.

Post-creation of Israel 
Following World War II, the United Nations divided Palestinian land into different sections. In 1948, mandatory Palestine was terminated and with the Israeli state was created. Palestinian territory was divided among Israel, Jordan, and Egypt. Although Israel later gained control of some Palestinian territory following The 1948 Arab-Israeli War, the people on this land did not have access to Israeli educational systems. The regions of East Jerusalem, the West Bank, and the Gaza Strip were required to follow Jordanian and Egyptian curriculum. Even after the annexation of the West Bank by Israel in 1967, Palestinians in the regions continued to follow Jordanian curricula due to the Israeli military control over Palestine. Following the signing of the Oslo Accord in 1993, Palestinians were able to create their own textbooks outside of Jordanian guidelines. From 1994 to 2000, the Palestinian authority was given the opportunity to establish their own textbooks with the supervision of the Jordanian Ministry of Education.

According to a 2018 study, in the 2017-2018 academic year of the 48 licensed and accredited higher education institutions in Palestine, women made up about 60% of the student population and 23% of the academic faculty. However, these statistics do not share the full experiences of students in Palestine. The Palestinian Monitoring Group has stated that Israeli military and settler activity in the Occupied Palestinian Territories (OPT) affected 28% of the Palestinian student population through killings, injuries and arrests. Additionally, due to curfew imposed by the Israeli army has caused the loss of more than 1,500 school days for students between 2003 and 2005.

Social impact of education 
Since the mid-1970s, families have been moving towards educating their daughters highly and enrolling them in universities rather than just getting a high school diploma. The reason for this change is that women are becoming needed in the labor market, changing the economic situation in the West Bank. The idea that an educated young woman is desirable for marriage is firmly established.

See also
Palestine women's national football team
General Union of Palestinian Women
Palestinian costumes
Islamic marital practices

References